Ewelme Watercress Beds is a   Local Nature Reserve in Ewelme in Oxfordshire. It is owned and managed by the Chiltern Society.

A stream runs through these former watercress beds, fed by a spring. Wildlife includes water voles, together with diverse invertebrates and plants.

References

Local nature reserves in Oxfordshire